The Victoria Philharmonic Choir is an 80-voice auditioned choir based in Victoria, British Columbia. Conducted since 2009, by artistic director Peter Butterfield, the choir performs a wide range of a cappella and accompanied music, and collaborates with or performs with community and professional vocal soloists and musicians, including the Victoria Symphony.

History

The Victoria Philharmonic Choir (VPC) was created June 2005, as a non-profit performing arts organization. April 2009, music director Peter Butterfield was appointed. Founding artistic director Simon Capet led the choir from June 2005 to January 2009.

Music 
Victoria Philharmonic Choir performs, on average, four concert events each season. The concerts include a variety of accompanied and unaccompanied mixed voice choral pieces. The choral repertoire is designed by artistic director Peter Butterfield in collaboration with choir manager, Sherry LePage. The VPC performs a community Christmas Carol Sing-a-Long each year. As well, the VPC hosts an annual "Summer Voices" learning event, a week long choral workshop that culminates in a live performance, usually scheduled in the first or second week of July.

Among the works performed by the Victoria Philharmonic Choir are: Carmina Burana by Carl Orff, Ode on St. Cecillia's Day by George Frederic Handel, Bach's St Matthew Passion, Verdi's Requiem, The Armed Man: A Mass for Peace by Karl Jenkins, Convoy PQ 17 by Christopher Butterfield, Vespro della Beata Vergine by Monteverdi, Haydn's Theresienmesse and Mozart's Requiem .

Collaborations 
This choir has been involved in many musical collaborations with noted artists such as: the Band Naden Band of the Royal Canadian Navy, the Victoria Symphony conducted by Tania Miller, the Victoria Civic Orchestra, dance troupe Coleman Lemieux & Compagnie and the Victoria Choral Society.

References

Sources 
 Philharmonic Choir opens season of Peace and Calm (Nov 4, 2017) https://www.peninsulanewsreview.com/entertainment/victoria-philharmonic-choir-opens-season-of-peace-and-calm/ Retrieved 2018-22-23 
 Kevin Bazzana: Choral music fit for a Pope (June 5, 2013) https://www.timescolonist.com/entertainment/music/kevin-bazzana-choral-music-fit-for-a-pope-1.313667 Retrieved 2018-22-23 
 Christmas Sing-a-longs with Victoria Philharmonic choir (Dec 8, 2011) https://www.vicnews.com/entertainment/christmas-sing-alongs-with-victoria-philharmonic-choir/ Retrieved 2018-22-23
 Victoria Philharmonic Choirs festival a benefit to all of us (Jul 8, 2008) http://www.pressreader.com/canada/times-colonist/20080708/281741265185740 Retrieved 2018-22-23

External links 

 

Musical groups established in 2005
Canadian choirs
Musical groups from Victoria, British Columbia
2005 establishments in British Columbia